The Bodil Award for Best Actor in a Supporting Role is one of the merit categories presented by the Danish Film Critics Association at the annual Bodil Awards. Created in 1948, it is one of the oldest film awards in Europe, and it honours the best performance by an actor in a supporting role in a Danish produced film. The jury can decide not to hand out the award, which happened numerous times between 1950 and 1985. Since 1986 it has been awarded every year.

Honorees

1940s 
 1948: Ib Schønberg won for his role in 
 1949: Johannes Meyer won for his role in The Viking Watch of the Danish Seaman

1950s 
 1950: Not awarded
 1951: Preben Lerdorff Rye won for his role in I gabestokken
 1952: Not awarded
 1953: Not awarded
 1954: Not awarded
 1955: Not awarded
 1956: Not awarded
 1957: Not awarded
 1958: Not awarded
 1959: Not awarded

1960s 
 1960: Not awarded
 1961: Not awarded
 1962: Henning Moritzen won for his role as Fyrst Igor in Harry and the Butler
 1963: Hans W. Petersen won for his role as Victor in 
 1964: Not awarded
 1965: Not awarded
 1966: Poul Bundgaard won for his role in Strike First Freddy
 1967: Kjeld Jacobsen won for his role as the father in Once There Was a War
 1968: Not awarded
 1969: Not awarded

1970s 
 1970: Preben Kaas won for his role as Dynamit Harry (Frandsen) in The Olsen Gang in a Fix
 1971: Karl Stegger won for his role as caretaker Frederiksen in Ballade på Christianshavn
 1972: Jørgen Ryg won for his role as adjutant Mühlhauser in Lenin, You Rascal, You
 1973: Not awarded
 1974: Not awarded
 1975: Jens Okking for his role as Brask in 19 Red Roses
 1976: Ole Larsen for his role in 
 1977: Dick Kaysø won for his role as John Bullnes in Strømer
 1978: Poul Bundgaard won for his role in 
 1979: Otto Brandenburg won for his role in

1980s 
 1980: Frits Helmuth won for his role in Johnny Larsen
 1981:  won for his role in Jeppe på bjerget
 1982:  won for his role in 
 1983:  won for his role in Der er et yndigt land
 1984:  won for his role in 
 1985: Not awarded
 1986:  won for his role in 
 1987:  won for his role in 
 1988: Björn Granath won for his role in Pelle the Conqueror
 1989: Erik Mørk won for his role in

1990s 
 1990: Henning Moritzen won for his role in Waltzing Regitze
 1991:  won for his role in Sirup
 1992: Nikolaj Lie Kaas won for his role in The Boys from St. Petri
 1993: Waage Sandø won for his role in Pain of Love
 1994: Jesper Langberg won for his role in Stolen Spring
 1995: Holger Juul Hansen won for his role as Einar Moesgaard in The Kingdom
 1996: Lars Knutzon won for his role in 
 1997: Zlatko Burić won for his role as Milo in Pusher
 1998: Jesper Christensen won for his role in Barbara
 1999: Nikolaj Lie Kaas won for his role in The Idiots

2000s 
 2000: Jesper Asholt won for his role as Rud in Mifune
 2001: Nicolaj Kopernikus won for his role as Stig in The Bench
 Henning Moritzen was nominated for his role as The Baron in A Place Nearby
 Ole Thestrup was nominated for his role as Alfred in Flickering Lights
 2002: Tommy Kenter won for his role as Anthon in Chop Chop
  was nominated for his role as Stromboli in Truly Human
 2003: Nikolaj Lie Kaas won for his role as Joachim in Open Hearts
 Jesper Christensen was nominated for his role in Okay
 Jesper Christensen was nominated for his role in Minor Mishaps
 Henrik Pripp was nominated for his role in Minor Mishaps
 2004: Peter Steen won for his role as Niels in The Inheritance
  was nominated for his role in Lykkevej
 Nicolas Bro was nominated for his role as Jimmy in Stealing Rembrandt
 Stellan Skarsgård was nominated for his role as Chuck in Dogville
 2005: Søren Pilmark won for his role as Erik Dreyer in King's Game
 Nicolas Bro was nominated for his role as Henrik Moll in King's Game
 Bent Mejding was nominated for his role as Henrik in Brothers
 Leif Sylvester Petersen was nominated for his role as Smeden in Pusher II
 2006: Nicolas Bro won for his role as Morfar in Dark Gorse
 Lin Kun Wu was nominated for his role as Feng in Kinamand
  was nominated for his role as Khalid in Adam's Apples
 Nicolas Bro was nominated for his role as Gunnar in Adam's Apples
 2007: Bent Mejding won for his role as Lindum-Svendsen in Drømmen
 Friðrik Þór Friðriksson was nominated for his role in Direktøren for det hele
 Jens Jørn Spottag was nominated for his role as Peder in Drømmen
 2008: Morten Grunwald won for his role in 
 Dejan Čukić was nominated for his role in De unge år
 Nicolaj Kopernikus was nominated for his role in De fortabte sjæles ø
 Cyron Melville was nominated for his role as Emil Andersen in Fightgirl Ayse
 2009: Kim Bodnia won for his role as Jørgen Buhl in Terribly Happy
 Lars Brygmann was nominated for his role as Dr. Zerlang in Terribly Happy'
  was nominated for his role in  Henrik Prip was nominated for his role in  Jens Jørn Spottag was nominated for his role as Anders Dahl in Worlds Apart 2010s 
 2010:  won for his role as Lars in Deliver Us from Evil Michael Falch was nominated for his role as Christian Barfoed in Applause Preben Harris was nominated for his role in Headhunter Henning Moritzen was nominated for his role in Headhunter Søren Pilmark was nominated for his role in Headhunter 2011:  won for his role in Nothing's All Bad Kim Bodnia was nominated for his role as Lars in In a Better World  was nominated for his role as Patrick in Brotherhood Gustav Fischer Kjærulff was nominated for his role as Martin in Submarino Roland Møller was nominated for his role as Mureren in R 2012: Lars Ranthe won for his role in A Funny Man Pilou Asbæk was nominated for his role in A Family David Dencik was nominated for his role as Martin in Room 304 John Hurt was nominated for his role as Dexter in Melancholia  Kiefer Sutherland was nominated for his role as John in Melancholia 2013: Tommy Kenter won for his role as Lachmann in The Passion of Marie Nicolas Bro was nominated for his role in  Lars Bom was nominated for his role as Lars Cold in Max Embarrassing 2 Thomas W. Gabrielsson was nominated for his role as Schack Carl von Rantzau in A Royal Affair Roland Møller was nominated for his role as Jan Sørensen in A Hijacking 2014: Roland Møller won for his role as Bjørn in Nordvest Fares Fares was nominated for his role as Assad in The Keeper of Lost Causes Jamie Bell was nominated for his role as K in Nymphomaniac Thomas Bo Larsen was nominated for his role as Tgeo in The Hunt 2015: Pilou Asbæk won for his role in Silent Heart 2016: Louis Hoffman won for his role in Land of Mine 2017: Lars Mikkelsen won for his role in The Day Will Come 2018: Søren Malling won for his role in  :  won for his role in Holiday 2020s 
 : Gustav Lindh won for his role in Queen of Hearts : Lars Brygmann won for his role in Riders of Justice''

See also 

 Robert Award for Best Actor in a Supporting Role

References

Sources

Further reading

External links 
  

1948 establishments in Denmark
Awards established in 1948
Actor in a supporting role
Film awards for supporting actor